King Salman Park is a proposed large-scale public park and urban district to be developed in Riyadh, Saudi Arabia.

Covering 16.6 square kilometers (6.4 square miles) on the grounds of the former King Salman Air Base, the park will be the largest urban park in the world, seven times the size of London’s Hyde Park and five times the size of New York’s Central Park. It is located in north-central Riyadh and will be served by five stations on the Green Line of the Riyadh Metro, as well as six main roads. Construction contracts for King Salman Park were awarded in 2021.

Announcement and plans
The development of King Salman Park was announced by the Saudi government in March 2019, and hailed for its size and scope. Saudi architecture and engineering firm Omrania was named as the lead design consultant on the project, collaborating with Danish firm Henning Larsen Architects on the master plan.

At an inauguration ceremony on Thursday, March 14, 2019, Riyadh Gov. Prince Faisal bin Bandar said, “The planners have skillfully designed the park with small valleys and rocky formations, which resembles the Najd region, thus giving it a natural beauty and distinctiveness from other parks in the city.” Construction began in late 2021 with more than USD $1 billion in contracts awarded by the King Salman Park Foundation.

Vision 2030 and Saudi Green Initiative
King Salman Park is one of four initiatives launched simultaneously in Riyadh on March 19, 2019, to fulfill the Kingdom’s Vision 2030 goals, along with Sports Boulevard, Green Riyadh (planting 7.5 million trees), and Riyadh Art (1,000 public art projects). The park will add significant green space to the Saudi capital city, which previously has had less green space per capita than other world cities.

The stated goal of these programs is to create sustainable and healthy communities, drive action against climate change, and provide up to 70,000 new jobs. Additionally, the government says its aim is to “significantly improve the lives of its citizens, transform the city into an attractive destination, and make it one of the world’s most livable cities.” These projects will cost an estimated $23 billion in government funding and will also leverage $15 billion worth of private sector development.

The park also supports the goals of the Saudi Green Initiative (SGI). As outlined in the annual SGI forum in October 2021, the initiative seeks to plant millions of trees, restore degraded land, and achieve net carbon emissions.

Design features
Preliminary plans call for a central park surrounded by cultural, residential, hotel, and commercial buildings. There will be 11.6 million square meters of green areas, a "Visitor Pavilion" and a “Royal Art Complex” of museums and theatres. A traffic-free path will form a 7.2-km (4.5 mile) “urban loop” within the park, catering to walking, cycling, and autonomous modes of public transportation. The park landscape will include “valley” pathways up to 30 meters (98 feet) deep, creating shaded areas with trickling streams and a variety of visitor attractions. These branching valleys are said to be inspired by Saudi Arabia’s seasonally dry wadi riverbeds, converging toward the centre of the site.

Basem Al-Shihabi, the founder of Omrania, the selected design consultant, said the park will bring back “human life" and "will change the very nature of Riyadh. It will actually fulfil the meaning of Al-Riyadh: The green land.” According to Middle East Architect magazine, "The park's landscape consists of a series of branching valleys, inspired by Saudi's seasonally dry wadi river beds, converging towards the centre of the site. Around the edges of each branch, protected from direct sunlight, visitors will be encouraged to use gathering spaces and activity areas."

The park is planned to include more than 160 features and attractions covering art, culture, sport and entertainment.

References

2019 establishments in Saudi Arabia
Projects established in 2019
Neighbourhoods in Riyadh
Parks in Riyadh
Proposed populated places
Proposed infrastructure in Saudi Arabia